In Riemannian geometry, the Rauch comparison theorem, named after Harry Rauch, who proved it in 1951, is a fundamental result which relates the sectional curvature of a Riemannian manifold to the rate at which geodesics spread apart.  Intuitively, it states that for positive curvature, geodesics tend to converge, while for negative curvature, geodesics tend to spread.

The statement of the theorem involves two Riemannian manifolds, and allows to compare the infinitesimal rate at which geodesics spread apart in the two manifolds, provided that their curvature can be compared. Most of the time, one of the two manifolds is a "comparison model", generally a manifold with constant curvature , and the second one is the manifold under study : a bound (either lower or upper) on its sectional curvature is then needed in order to apply Rauch comparison theorem.

Statement

Assume that  has no conjugate points along , and let  be two normal Jacobi fields along  and  such that :

  and 
 .

If the sectional curvature of every 2-plane containing  is less or equal than the sectional curvature of every 2-plane  containing , then  for all .

Conditions of the theorem 
The theorem is formulated using Jacobi fields to measure the variation in geodesics. As the tangential part of a Jacobi field is independent of the geometry of the manifold, the theorem focuses on normal Jacobi fields, i.e. Jacobi fields which are orthogonal to the speed vector  of the geodesic for all time . Up to reparametrization, every variation of geodesics induces a normal Jacobi field.

Analog theorems 
Under very similar conditions, it is also possible to compare the Hessian of the distance fonction to a given point. It is also possible to compare  the Laplacian of this function (which is the trace of the Hessian), with some additional condition on one of the two manifolds: it is then enough to have an inequality on the Ricci curvature (which is the trace of the curvature tensor).

See also
Toponogov's theorem

References

do Carmo, M.P. Riemannian Geometry, Birkhäuser, 1992.
 Lee, J. M., Riemannian Manifolds: An Introduction to Curvature, Springer, 1997.

Theorems in Riemannian geometry